Bernard Kiprop may refer to:

Bernard Kiprop Koech (born 1988), Kenyan marathon runner
Bernard Kiprop Kipyego (born 1986) Kenyan marathon runner